This is a list of operational, offshore wind farms in the North Sea.

This information is gathered from multiple Internet sources, and primarily the 4C Offshore's Global Offshore Wind Farm Map and Database and is current up to July 2015. The name of the Wind Farm is the name used by the Energy Company when referring to the Farm and is usually related to a shoal or the name of the nearest town on shore.

Operational wind farms
The list can be sorted by clicking the triangle symbols at the top of each column.

Windfarm home pages

See also

Wind power in Europe
List of wind farms
List of offshore wind farms
Lists of offshore wind farms by country
Lists of offshore wind farms by water area
List of offshore wind farms in the United Kingdom
List of offshore wind farms in Denmark
List of offshore wind farms in the Netherlands
List of offshore wind farms in Germany
Wind power in the United Kingdom
Wind power in Denmark
Wind power in the Netherlands
Wind power in Belgium
Wind power in France
Wind power in Germany

References

 
North Sea